

Winners of major team competitions 1988-1989

Men 

 Germany : BBC Bayreuth
 Spain : FC Barcelona Bàsquet
 France : Limoges CSP
 Italy : Olimpia Milano

Player awards (NBA)

Regular Season MVP 
 Magic Johnson, Los Angeles Lakers

NBA Finals MVP 

 Joe Dumars, Detroit Pistons

Slam Dunk Contest 

 Kenny Walker, New York Knicks

Three-point Shootout 

 Dale Ellis, Seattle SuperSonics

Collegiate awards
 Men
John R. Wooden Award: Sean Elliott, Arizona
Naismith College Coach of the Year: Mike Krzyzewski, Duke
Frances Pomeroy Naismith Award: Tim Hardaway, UTEP
Associated Press College Basketball Player of the Year: Sean Elliott, Arizona
NCAA basketball tournament Most Outstanding Player: Anderson Hunt, UNLV
USBWA National Freshman of the Year: Chris Jackson, LSU
Associated Press College Basketball Coach of the Year: Bob Knight, Indiana
Naismith Outstanding Contribution to Basketball: Nat Holman
 Women
Naismith College Player of the Year: Clarissa Davis, Texas
Naismith College Coach of the Year: Pat Summitt, Tennessee
Wade Trophy: Clarissa Davis, Texas
Frances Pomeroy Naismith Award: Paulette Backstrom, Bowling Green
NCAA basketball tournament Most Outstanding Player: Bridgette Gordon, Tennessee
Carol Eckman Award: Linda Hill-MacDonald, Minnesota

Naismith Memorial Basketball Hall of Fame
Class of 1989:
William Gates
K.C. Jones
Lenny Wilkens

Deaths
April 8 — Horia Demian, Romanian club player (U Cluj) (born 1942)
April 16 — Sam "Boom Boom" Wheeler, American professional player (Harlem Globetrotters, Harlem Magicians) (born 1923)
April 23 — Norm Baker, Canadian BBA and PCPBL player (born 1923)
July 26 — Bob Spessard, All-American college player and coach (Washington and Lee) (born 1915)
August 14 — Ricky Berry, American NBA player (Sacramento Kings) (born 1964)
August 21 — Scott Fenton, Australian player (Perth Wildcats) (born 1964)
September 7 — Valery Goborov, Soviet player (born 1966)
September 22 — Bob Calihan, All-American college player and coach (Detroit), NBL player (born 1918)
October 7 — Earl Thomas, American NBL player (born 1915)
October 8 — Oscar Moglia, Uruguayan Olympic and club player (Club Atlético Welcome) (born 1935)
October 12 — Rolando Bacigalupo, Peruvian Olympic player (born 1914)
October 30 — Douglas Legg, British Olympic player (born 1914)
October 30 — Raymond Offner, French Olympic player (born 1927)
December 3 — Fernando Martín Espina, Spanish player (Real Madrid, Portland Trail Blazers) (born 1962)
Date unknown — Liviu Naghy, Romanian Olympic player (born 1929)

See also
 1989 in sports

References